Mohd Firdaus bin Mohd Faudzi (born 2 August 1987 in Kedah) is a Malaysian professional footballer who plays as a right back for Kuala Lumpur in the Malaysia Super League.

Career statistics

Club

References

External links
 

1987 births
Living people
Malaysian footballers
People from Kedah
Malaysian people of Malay descent
Kuala Lumpur City F.C. players
Terengganu FC players
Association football defenders
Felda United F.C. players
Sime Darby F.C. players
Kedah Darul Aman F.C. players
Perlis FA players
Kuala Muda Naza F.C. players